ROA may refer to:

Sports and Arts
Racehorse Owners Association, a British horse racing organisation
Refugee Olympics Athletes, a selection of refugees who will be competing under the Olympic flag at the 2016 Summer Olympics
Revolt On Antares, a science-fiction themed microgame designed by Tom Moldvay and produced by TSR in 1981
Rules of Acquisition, in the fictional Star Trek universe, a set of guidelines intended to ensure the profitability of businesses owned by members of the ultra-capitalist alien race known as Ferengi
X-Men Legends II: Rise of Apocalypse, a video/computer game
Rivals of Aether, a 2017 fighting game

People
ROA (artist) (born c. 1975), pseudonym of a Belgian graffiti artist known for his large realistic depictions of animals in black-and-white
ROA Crewe-Milnes (1858–1945), a British statesman and writer

Government
ROA Time, the official time of Spain established by The Royal Institute and Observatory of the Spanish Navy in San Fernando, Cádiz
Rehabilitation of Offenders Act 1974, United Kingdom act that enables some criminal convictions to be ignored after a rehabilitation period

Military
Reserve Officers Association, a professional association of officers, former officers, and spouses of all the uniformed services of the United States
Russian Liberation Army (РОА in cyrillic letters, or ROA), a group of predominantly Russian forces subordinated to the Nazi German high command during World War II

Finance
Return on assets, a financial metric
Real Options Analysis, option valuation techniques for capital budgeting decisions

Science and medicine
Raman optical activity, a vibrational spectroscopic technique
Right occipito-anterior, a cephalic vertex presentation in childbirth where the fetus is in a longitudinal lie and the head enters the pelvis first
Roaccutane, a medication used mostly for cystic acne and in chemotherapy
Route of administration, in pharmacology and toxicology, the path by which a drug, fluid, poison, or other substance is taken into the body
Route Origin Authorisation (Internet routing), a cryptographically signed entry in IP registry databases that specifies the authorized source AS of a certain network
 Rutgers Optimality Archive, an archive of work in Optimality Theory managed by Eric Bakovic

Schools
Retford Oaks Academy, a secondary school with academy status in the market town of Retford, Nottinghamshire, England
River Oaks Academy, a private kindergarten through 12th grade school in the Westchase district of Houston, Texas

Other uses
Peugeot ROA, an Iranian made car
Roanoke Regional Airport in Roanoke, Virginia, USA,  IATA code
Rear Occupant Alert (a warning when the door is closed with people left in the vehicle)
Resource-oriented architecture, a style of software architecture and programming paradigm for designing and developing software
Reformed Armenian Orthography, a spelling reform of the Armenian alphabet in 1922–1924
Ruger Old Army, a black-powder percussion revolver introduced in 1972 by the Sturm, Ruger company
Republic of Artsakh, unrecognized state in Southern Caucasus
Route Origination Authorization, proof of authorization to announce a route for an IP prefix

See also 
Roa (disambiguation)
 Röa (disambiguation)